Nonfinite is the opposite of finite

 a nonfinite verb is a verb that is not capable of serving as the main verb in an independent clause
 a non-finite clause is a clause whose main verb is non-finite

See also
 Infinite (disambiguation)